Allie V. Craycraft, Jr. (born May 30, 1932) is an American former politician from the state of Indiana. A Democrat, he served in the Indiana State Senate from 1978 to 2006.

Craycraft is currently an Associate Pastor at the Illuminate Church in Muncie. In 2016, he was elected as the Delaware County Democratic Party Chairman. His son, Steve, currently serves as Delaware County Auditor

References

Living people
1932 births
Indiana state senators